Saint Laurent, Saint-Laurent, St. Laurent or St-Laurent may refer to:

Places

Canada
 Saint-Laurent river
 St. Laurent, Manitoba
 Saint-Laurent, New Brunswick
 Saint-Laurent, Quebec, a borough of the city of Montreal, Quebec
 Bas-Saint-Laurent, a region of Quebec
 Saint-Laurent (electoral district), an electoral district Montreal, Quebec
 Louis-Saint-Laurent (electoral district), a federal riding of Canada in Quebec
 Saint-Laurent—Cartierville, a federal riding of Canada in Quebec
 Saint-Laurent (provincial electoral district), a Quebec provincial electoral district
 Montréal-Saint-Laurent, a former Quebec provincial electoral district
 St. Laurent de Grandin, Saskatchewan
 Saint-Laurent-de-l'Île-d'Orléans

France
Saint-Laurent, Ardennes, in the Ardennes département 
Saint-Laurent, Cher, in the Cher département 
Saint-Laurent, Côtes-d'Armor, in the Côtes-d'Armor département 
Saint-Laurent, Creuse, in the Creuse département
Saint-Laurent, Haute-Garonne, in the Haute-Garonne département
Saint-Laurent, Haute-Savoie, in the Haute-Savoie département  
Saint-Laurent, Lot-et-Garonne, in the Lot-et-Garonne département 
Saint-Laurent-Blangy, in the Pas-de-Calais département
Saint-Laurent-Bretagne, in the Pyrénées-Atlantiques département 
Saint-Laurent-Chabreuges, in the Haute-Loire département 
Saint-Laurent-d'Agny, in the Rhône département 
Saint-Laurent-d'Aigouze, in the Gard département 
Saint-Laurent-d'Andenay, in the Saône-et-Loire département 
Saint-Laurent-d'Arce, in the Gironde département 
Saint-Laurent-de-Belzagot, in the Charente département 
Saint-Laurent-de-Brèvedent, in the Seine-Maritime département 
Saint-Laurent-de-Carnols, in the Gard département 
Saint-Laurent-de-Cerdans, in the Pyrénées-Orientales  département 
Saint-Laurent-de-Céris, in the Charente département 
Saint-Laurent-de-Chamousset, in the Rhône  département 
Saint-Laurent-de-Cognac, in the Charente département 
Saint-Laurent-de-Condel, in the Calvados département 
Saint-Laurent-de-Cuves, in the Manche département
Saint-Laurent-de-Gosse, in the Landes département 
Saint-Laurent-de-Jourdes, in the Vienne département 
Saint-Laurent-de-la-Barrière, in the Charente-Maritime  département 
Saint-Laurent-de-la-Cabrerisse, in the Aude département 
Saint-Laurent-de-la-Plaine, in the Maine-et-Loire  département 
Saint-Laurent-de-la-Prée, in the Charente-Maritime  département
Saint-Laurent-de-la-Salanque, in the Pyrénées-Orientales  département 
Saint-Laurent-de-la-Salle, in the Vendée  département 
Saint-Laurent-de-Lévézou, in the Aveyron département 
Saint-Laurent-de-Lin, in the Indre-et-Loire  département 
Saint-Laurent-de-Mure, in the Rhône  département 
Saint-Laurent-de-Muret, in the Lozère  département 
Saint-Laurent-de-Neste, in the Hautes-Pyrénées  département 
Saint-Laurent-des-Arbres, in the Gard département 
Saint-Laurent-des-Autels, in the Maine-et-Loire  département 
Saint-Laurent-des-Bâtons, in the Dordogne département 
Saint-Laurent-des-Bois, Eure, in the Eure département 
Saint-Laurent-des-Bois, Loir-et-Cher, in the Loir-et-Cher  département 
Saint-Laurent-des-Combes, Charente, in the Charente département 
Saint-Laurent-des-Combes, Gironde, in the Gironde département 
Saint-Laurent-des-Hommes, in the Dordogne département 
Saint-Laurent-des-Mortiers, in the Mayenne département 
Saint-Laurent-des-Vignes, in the Dordogne département 
Saint-Laurent-de-Terregatte, in the Manche département 
Saint-Laurent-de-Trèves, in the Lozère  département 
Saint-Laurent-de-Vaux, in the Rhône  département 
Saint-Laurent-de-Veyrès, in the Lozère  département
Saint-Laurent-d'Oingt, in the Rhône  département 
Saint-Laurent-d'Olt, in the Aveyron département 
Saint-Laurent-d'Onay, in the Drôme  département 
Saint-Laurent-du-Bois, in the Gironde département 
Saint-Laurent-du-Cros, in the Hautes-Alpes  département 
Saint-Laurent-du-Mont, in the Calvados département
Saint-Laurent-du-Mottay, in the Maine-et-Loire  département 
Saint-Laurent-du-Pape, in the Ardèche  département 
Saint-Laurent-du-Plan, in the Gironde département 
 Saint-Laurent-du-Pont, in the Isère département
 Saint-Laurent-du-Tencement, in the Eure département
 Saint-Laurent-du-Var, in the Alpes-Maritimes département
 Saint-Laurent-du-Verdon, in the Alpes-de-Haute-Provence département
 Saint-Laurent-en-Beaumont, in the Isère département
 Saint-Laurent-en-Brionnais, in the Saône-et-Loire département
 Saint-Laurent-en-Caux, in the Seine-Maritime département
 Saint-Laurent-en-Gâtines, in the Indre-et-Loire département
 Saint-Laurent-en-Grandvaux, in the Jura département
 Saint-Laurent-en-Royans, in the Drôme département
 Saint-Laurent-l'Abbaye, in the Nièvre département
 Saint-Laurent-la-Conche, in the Loire département
 Saint-Laurent-la-Gâtine, in the Eure-et-Loir département
 Saint-Laurent-la-Roche, in the Jura département
 Saint-Laurent-la-Vallée, in the Dordogne département
 Saint-Laurent-la-Vernède, in the Gard département
 Saint-Laurent-le-Minier, in the Gard département
 Saint-Laurent-les-Bains, in the Ardèche département
 Saint-Laurent-les-Églises, in the Haute-Vienne département
 Saint-Laurent-les-Tours, in the Lot département
 Saint-Laurent-Lolmie, in the Lot département
 Saint-Laurent-Médoc, in the Gironde département
 Saint-Laurent-Nouan, in the Loir-et-Cher département
 Saint-Laurent-Rochefort, in the Loire département
 Saint-Laurent-sous-Coiron, in the Ardèche département
 Saint-Laurent-sur-Gorre, in the Haute-Vienne département
 Saint-Laurent-sur-Manoire, in the Dordogne département
 Saint-Laurent-sur-Mer, in the Calvados département
 Saint-Laurent-sur-Othain, in the Meuse département
 Saint-Laurent-sur-Oust, in the Morbihan département
 Saint-Laurent-sur-Saône, in the Ain département
 Saint-Laurent-sur-Sèvre, in the Vendée département

French Guiana
 Saint-Laurent-du-Maroni

Roads and transit stations 
Saint Laurent Boulevard, a street in Montreal
Saint-Laurent (Montreal Metro)
St. Laurent Boulevard, a main road in Ottawa's east end
St-Laurent station, a light rail station in Ottawa
Boulevard Saint-Laurent (Gatineau), a main boulevard in downtown Gatineau, Quebec

Other uses
 SS Saint-Laurent, a French 19th-century ocean liner
 Saint Laurent (cruise ship), a French cruise ship
 Saint-Laurent (train), a Canadian passenger train service 
 Saint Laurent (film), a 2014 French biographical film about Yves Saint Laurent
 St. Laurent (grape), a wine grape that originated in France
 "Saint Laurent" (song), by DJ Sliink, Skrillex, and Wale, 2017
 Cégep de Saint-Laurent, a CEGEP in Montreal
 Church of Saint-Laurent, a church in Paris
 Saint-Laurent Nuclear Power Plant, in Saint-Laurent-Nouan, France
 Saint-Laurent Herald, one of the Heralds of Arms at the Canadian Heraldic Authority
 St. Laurent Shopping Centre, a shopping centre in Ottawa
 Yves Saint Laurent (brand), a luxury fashion house commonly known as Saint Laurent

People with the surname
 Jean-Paul St. Laurent, Canadian politician and son of Louis St. Laurent
 Jeanne St. Laurent, wife of the former Canadian prime minister
 Louis St. Laurent, 12th Prime Minister of Canada
 Yves Saint Laurent (designer)
 Jared St. Laurent, commentator for Major League Wrestling

See also 
 Battle of St-Laurent-de-la-Muga (1794), a battle between France and Spain
 Laurent (disambiguation)
 Laurent (name)
 Laurent-Marie-Joseph Imbert, one of the Korean Martyrs
 Saint Lawrence (disambiguation)
 San Lawrenz, a village in Gozo, Malta
 San Lorenzo (disambiguation)
 Sankt Lorenzen (disambiguation)
 São Lourenço (disambiguation)
 Yves Saint Laurent (film), a 2014 French biographical film